Castle Story is a sandbox and real-time strategy game developed by Sauropod Studio. Funded through crowdfunding website Kickstarter in 2012, the game launched in September 2013 in early access, and was fully released in August 2017.

Gameplay 

In Castle Story, the player is in control of workers called "Bricktrons" which can be directed to gather resources, build castles and fight enemies. The aim is to build a castle that can withstand attacks from creatures and other players. The game takes place on massive floating islands.

Development 
Castle Story was the debut game developed by Sauropod Studio, an indie game developer based in Montreal, Canada. The game was first announced in December 2011; around this time, Sauropod was a team of two people. Sauropod Studio was formally founded as a company on 24 April 2012 by François Alain (general director), Germain Couet (artistic director), and Benoît Alain (lead programmer and chief technical officer). A crowdfunding campaign was launched through the website Kickstarter on 27 July 2012, seeking . This goal was reached and exceeded within five hours of the campaign's launch. The campaign concluded after one month, with a total of  pledged. Sauropod credited Markus Persson, the creator of the game Minecraft who publicly approved of the game, with leading the Kickstarter campaign to the success it had. Beta versions of the game were later shared with backers who had pledged  or more. Castle Story was made publicly available as a paid early access game through the digital distribution platform Steam on 23 September 2013. The game was fully released on 17 August 2017 for Linux, macOS and Microsoft Windows, with Sauropod shifting to bugfixes and developing post-launch content.

Following onto the release of Castle Story, Sauropod began production on a second game, Mirador. This game had a troubled development, frequently shuffling the designer position. A Kickstarter crowdfunding campaign seeking  did not manage to get funded halfway and Sauropod failed to find a publisher to finance the game. Instead, the Canadian Media Fund invested . As Mirador drew closer to release, it came to the studio's employees attention that the money the studio had would not suffice to keep it running until the end of 2019. The game was eventually released on 26 July 2019 without prior early access availability. The idea of using early access was considered but ultimately rejected as the studio did not plan to support the game greatly post-launch. Sauropod's management assured its employees that the majority would move on to the studio's next project. However, on 23 September 2019, it was reported that, due to the foregoing money mismanagement, Sauropod had laid off all of its 20 employees. François Alain and Couet stated in October 2019 that stated that Sauropod was still active, despite having laid off all staff.

References

External links 
 

2017 video games
Indie video games
Kickstarter-funded video games
Linux games
MacOS games
Multiplayer and single-player video games
Real-time strategy video games
Survival video games
Video games developed in Canada
Video games set in castles
Video games with voxel graphics
Windows games